Filothei is a village of the Thermi municipality, northern Greece. The 2011 census recorded 232 inhabitants in the village. Filothei is a part of the community of Nea Raidestos.

See also
List of settlements in the Thessaloniki regional unit

References

Populated places in Thessaloniki (regional unit)